Tülay Tuğcu (born June 12, 1942 in Ankara) is a retired Turkish judge. She was the President of the Constitutional Court of Turkey, Chief Justice of Turkey. She retired on June 12, 2007.

Biography

Tuğcu was born in Ankara and attended TED College for primary and high school. In 1961, she enrolled in Ankara University Faculty of Law and graduated in 1965. After working as a lawyer for 4 years, she successfully passed the exams required to start working at the Council of State (Danıştay) as assistant to Council of State. 

In 1974, she graduated from Institute of "Public Administration of Turkey and the Middle East" (Türkiye ve Ortadoğu Amme İdaresi Enstitüsü - TODAİE) in Ankara. 

In 1982, she was appointed to the senior judicial ost of Investigation at First Department of the Council of State, where she served until 1992.

In 1992, Tülay Tuğcu was elected member of Turkish Council of State and started serving at the Sixth Department. After 3 years, she was transferred to the Tenth Department of Council of State and continued serving there.

On December 22, 1999, she was appointed as a member of the Constitutional Court by President Ahmet Necdet Sezer among three candidates determined by the General Assembly of State Council.

Thereafter, she was elected President of the Court of Jurisdictional Disputes on January 6, 2004 and as Chief of the Supreme Court on July 25, 2005 consequently.

Other facts and information

Tuğcu holds two theses in "Extradition of Criminals" and "The Use of Approval Rights of Administration by High Officials" and a translation in "Productivity". 

She is married and has two children.

In one of her messages to the public on Supreme Court’s official website, she said:

"... if we want to name the age we are living in, the best can be the "age of communication". In order to be able to adjust to this age, people’s rights to access the information, the sharing of the accessible information and making it common must be provided. Even though it has not been clearly arranged in our constitution, the right to access the information is a "sine qua non" of basic rights and freedom. Without doubt, the internet websites of the public institutions that are equipped with the latest and satisfactory information play a crucial role in managing it."

Notes

References 
  Nur Batur's interview with Tuğcu

External links
Official Page of Turkish Constitutional Court 

1942 births
Living people
People from Ankara
Ankara University Faculty of Law alumni
Turkish women civil servants
Turkish civil servants
Turkish judges
Presidents of the Constitutional Court of Turkey